Dyschirius jelineki is a species of ground beetle in the subfamily Scaritinae. It was described by Bulirsch in 2009.

References

jelineki
Beetles described in 2009